Mohamed Talaat Abdelrahman Abdou (born May 14, 1989) is an Egyptian footballer. He plays as a striker for Egyptian club ZED.

Career
Talaat began his career at a local team in Port Said called Porfouad. He was chosen to play for the Egypt Under 20 national team in Youth African Cup of Nations. When he managed to become the top goalscorer of the team he was spotted by a number of clubs in Egypt and the Persian Gulf, and later it was announced that he joined UAE side Ahli Dubai.

In January 2009 transfer window, Talaat joined Egyptian Premier League top club Al Ahly, He made his debut with the club in a Premier League match against Tersana.

Talaat has scored his first goal with Al-Ahly in his second appearance with the club at the final game of the 2008-09 season against El-Geish.

References

http://m-talaat.yoo7.com

1989 births
Living people
Association football forwards
Al Ahly SC players
Expatriate footballers in Kuwait
Egyptian footballers
Egypt international footballers
People from Port Said
Ittihad El Shorta SC players
Egyptian Premier League players
Al Tadhamon SC players
Kuwait Premier League players
Egyptian expatriate sportspeople in Kuwait
Egyptian expatriate footballers
Al Mokawloon Al Arab SC players
That Ras Club players
Petaling Jaya City FC players
Egyptian expatriate sportspeople in Malaysia
Malaysia Premier League players
Expatriate footballers in Malaysia
Ghazl El Mahalla SC players
Shabab Al-Ahli Club players
Expatriate footballers in the United Arab Emirates
Egyptian expatriate sportspeople in the United Arab Emirates
UAE Pro League players